Werner Sobeck (25 May 1922 – 24 July 2003) was a German diver. He competed in two events at the 1952 Summer Olympics.

References

External links
 

1922 births
2003 deaths
German male divers
Olympic divers of Germany
Divers at the 1952 Summer Olympics
Divers from Berlin
20th-century German people